The Christian Democratic Party (PDC) is a Christian-democratic political party in Bolivia.

Founded on 6 February 1954 as the Social Christian Party (PSC), it assumed its present name at a party congress in November 1964. Its intellectual foundations were study centres of the Church's social doctrine, the Bolivian Catholic Action and “Integral Humanism” (a centre for the study of the philosophy of Jacques Maritain). It remains a conventionally “tercerista” Party, calling for a “third way” between capitalism and socialism – a way that would be more humane and truly democratic than either competing social-political system. Founded by Remo Di Natale, Benjamín Miguel Harb, Javier Caballero, and Emanuel Andrade.

It boycotted the 1964 and 1966 presidential votes.

In 1967, the party took part in the Government of the President of René Barrientos Ortuño, being given responsibility for the Ministry of Labour and Social Security and this was a major misjudgment by the PDC leadership. When military forces carried out bloody raids against mining camps, the Christian Democratic Party was forced to withdraw in anger and embarrassment, with severe internal divisions resulting. The party's youth organization had been discontented with the third-road philosophy for some time, and the mine camp invasions helped to crystallize their rebellion; they favored revolutionary socialism as a solution to Bolivia's dilemmas. In the late 1960s, the youth wing seceded to form the Revolutionary PDC which later became the Revolutionary Left Movement (MIR). Several discontented members of the party, including Jose Luis Roca Garcia, also left to join General Alfredo Ovando Candía's short-lived nationalist revolutionary government in 1969–1970.

Under the dictatorship of President Hugo Banzer Suárez the Christian Democratics fought for human rights, fundamental freedoms and the holding of elections, but its president Benjamín Miguel Harb was exiled in 1974 and its organizing secretary Felix Vargas forced to leave the country shortly afterwards.

The PDC took part in 1978 general elections, running former Defense Minister General René Bernal Escalante, a leader of the right-wing faction of which supported the Hugo Banzer Suárez regime. After the 1978 election, René Bernal Escalante split from the PDC and founded the Christian Democratic Union.

For the elections held on 1 July 1979, the party joined the Revolutionary Nationalist Movement-Alliance with four other parties — the Revolutionary Nationalist Movement (MNR), the Authentic Revolutionary Party (PRA), the Marxist Leninist Communist Party (PCML) and the Tupaj Katari Revolutionary Movement (MRTK). The Alliance ran a MNR’s leader Víctor Paz Estenssoro as its Presidential candidate and a PDC’s leader Luis Ossio Sanjines as its Vice-Presidential candidate. In 1979 the Christian Democratic Party won nine seats in the Chamber of Deputies and three in the Senate.

In 1980 the PDC took part in an electoral coalition Democratic Revolutionary Front-New Alternative backing ex-President Luis Adolfo Siles Salinas, which polled few votes; the leader of the PDC Benjamín Miguel Harb ran as Vice-Presidential candidate.

Soon after the restoration of democratic government, in November 1982, Christian Democratics took a seat in the Hernán Siles Zuazo Government, but withdrew from the coalition in October 1984.

The PDC took part in 1985 general elections, running Luis Ossio Sanjines as its presidential candidate and Jaime Ponce García as vice-presidential candidate, and won three seats in the Chamber of Deputies.
Although winning no legislative seats as an ally of the Nationalist Democratic Action in May 1989, Luis Ossio Sanjines, was elected Vice-President of the Republic as a result of its adherence to the Nationalist Democratic Action – Revolutionary Left Movement pact (Patriotic Agreement) in August. The PDC campaigned as a member of the Patriotic Agreement in 1993 elections. The Christian Democratic Party was one of the founding components of Social and Democratic Power (PODEMOS), for which it provided its electoral registration. Following the 2005 election, this alliance led the parliamentary opposition to President Evo Morales.

Notes

1954 establishments in Bolivia
Bolivian nationalism
Catholic political parties
Christian democratic parties in South America
Christian humanism
Conservative parties in Bolivia
Nationalist parties in Bolivia
Political parties established in 1954
Political parties in Bolivia
Right-wing populist parties
Social conservative parties